

Amateur boxing
 April 30 – May 7: 2017 Asian Amateur Boxing Championships in  Tashkent
  won both the gold and overall medal tallies.
 June 10 – 18: 2017 AMBC Elite American Confederation Boxing Championships in  Tegucigalpa
  won the gold and overall medal tallies.
 June 16 – 24: 2017 European Amateur Boxing Championships (Men) in  Kharkiv
  won the gold medal tally.  won the overall medal tally.
 June 17 – 25: 2017 AFBC Elite African Confederation Boxing Championships in  Brazzaville
 Note: This event was supposed to be held on May 27 to June 4.
  won the gold medal tally.  won the overall medal tally.
 June 26 – 29: 2017 OCBC Elite Oceanian Confederation Boxing Championships (Men) in  Gold Coast, Queensland
  won both the gold and overall medal tallies.
 August 4 – 13: 2017 Women's European Amateur Boxing Championships in  Cascia
  won the gold medal tally.  won the overall medal tally.
 August 25 – September 3: 2017 AIBA World Boxing Championships in  Hamburg
  won both the gold and overall medal tallies.
 November 19 – 26: 2017 AIBA Women's Junior & Youth World Championships in  Guwahati
  won both the gold and overall medal tallies.

Fencing

World fencing events

 April 1 – 10: 2017 World Junior and Cadet Fencing Championships in  Plovdiv
  won both the gold and overall medal tallies.
 July 19 – 26: 2017 World Fencing Championships in  Leipzig
  won both the gold and overall medal tallies.

Continental fencing events
 February 24 – March 5: 2017 Asian Junior and Cadet Fencing Championships in  Bangkok
 Junior:  won the gold medal tally.  won the overall medal tally.
 Cadet:  won both the gold and overall medal tallies.
 February 27 – March 5: 2017 Pan American Junior and Cadet Fencing Championships in  Havana
 Junior: The  won both the gold and overall medal tallies.
 Cadet: 
 February 28 – March 9: 2017 European Junior and Cadet Fencing Championships in  Plovdiv
 Junior:  won the gold medal tally. Russia and  won 12 overall medals each.
 Cadet:  
 March 7 – 12: 2017 African Junior Fencing Championships in  Yamoussoukro
  won both the gold and overall medal tallies.
 June 8 – 12: 2017 African Fencing Championships in  Cairo
  won both the gold and overall medal tallies.
 June 12 – 17: 2017 European Fencing Championships in  Tbilisi
  won both the gold and overall medal tallies.
 June 13 – 18: 2017 Pan American Fencing Championships in  Montreal
 The  won both the gold and overall medal tallies.
 June 15 – 20: 2017 Asian Fencing Championships in 
  won both the gold and overall medal tallies.

2016–17 Fencing Grand Prix
 Épée Grand Prix
 December 9 – 11, 2016: Qatari Grand Prix in  Doha
 Winners:  KWEON Young-jun (m) /  Sarra Besbes (f)
 March 24 – 26: Hungarian Grand Prix in  Budapest
 Winners:  Jung Jin-sun (m) /  Rossella Fiamingo (f)
 May 26 – 28: Colombian Grand Prix in  Bogotá
 Winners:  Bohdan Nikishyn (m) /  Emese Szász (f)
 Foil Grand Prix
 December 2 – 4, 2016: Italian Grand Prix in  Turin
 Winners:  Alessio Foconi (m) /  Lee Kiefer (f) 
 March 18 & 19: American Grand Prix in  Long Beach, California
 Winners:  Timur Safin (m) /  Lee Kiefer (f)
 May 19 – 21: Chinese Grand Prix in  Shanghai
 Winners:  Richard Kruse (m) /  Martina Batini (f)
 Sabre Grand Prix
 December 16 – 18, 2016: Mexican Grand Prix in  Cancún
 Winners:  Luigi Samele (m) /  Yana Egorian (f) 
 March 31 & April 1: Korean Grand Prix in  Seoul
 Winners:  Kim Jung-hwan (m) /  Yana Egorian (f)
 June 2 – 4: Russian Grand Prix in  Moscow
 Winners:  Luca Curatoli (m) /  Charlotte Lembach (f)

2016–17 Fencing World Cup
 Men's Épée World Cup
 October 28 – 30, 2016: Swiss World Cup in  Bern
 Winner:  Nikita Glazkov
 Team winners: 
 November 18 – 20, 2016: Argentinian World Cup in  Buenos Aires
 Winner:  Park Sang-young
 Team winners: 
 January 26 – 28: German Épée World Cup in  Heidenheim an der Brenz
 Winner:  Park Kyoung-doo
 Team winners: 
 February 17 – 19: Canadian World Cup in  Vancouver
 Winner:  Max Heinzer
 Team winners: The 
 May 12 – 14: French Épée World Cup (final) in  Paris
 Winner:  Marco Fichera
 Team winners: 
 Women's Épée World Cup
 October 21 – 23, 2016: Estonian World Cup in  Tallinn
 Winner:  Tatiana Logunova
 Team winners: 
 November 11 – 13, 2016: Chinese Épée World Cup in  Suzhou
 Winner:  Anna van Brummen
 Team winners: 
 January 20 – 22: Spanish Épée World Cup in  Barcelona
 Winner:  Sun Yiwen
 Team winners: 
 February 10 – 12: Italian Épée World Cup in  Legnano
 Winner:  Julia Beljajeva
 Team winners: 
 May 5 – 7: Brazilian World Cup (final) in  Rio de Janeiro
 Winner:  Kristina Kuusk
 Team winners: 
 Men's Foil World Cup
 October 21 – 23, 2016: Egyptian World Cup in  Cairo
 Winner:  Race Imboden
 Team winners: 
 November 11 – 13, 2016: Japanese World Cup in  Tokyo
 Winner:  Miles Chamley-Watson
 Team winners: 
 January 20 – 22: French Men's Foil World Cup in  Paris
 Winner:  Alexander Massialas
 Team winners: 
 February 10 – 12: German Men's Foil World Cup in  Bonn
 Winner:  Peter Joppich
 Team winners:  
 May 5 – 7: Russian World Cup (final) in  Saint Petersburg
 Winner:  Daniele Garozzo
 Team winners: 
 Women's Foil World Cup
 October 14 – 16, 2016: Mexican World Cup in  Cancún
 Winner:  Arianna Errigo
 Team winners: 
 November 4 – 6, 2016: French Women's Foil World Cup in  Saint-Maur-des-Fossés
 Winner:  Inna Deriglazova
 Team winners: 
 January 13 – 15: Algerian World Cup in  Algiers
 Winner:  Ysaora Thibus
 Team winners: 
 February 3 – 5: Polish Foil World Cup in  Gdańsk
 Winner:  Svetlana Tripapina
 Team winners: 
 April 28 – 30: German Women's Foil World Cup (final) in  Tauberbischofsheim
 Winner:  Lee Kiefer
 Team winners: 
 Men's Sabre World Cup
 November 4 – 6, 2016: Senegalese World Cup in  Dakar
 Winner:  Vincent Anstett
 Team winners: 
 December 2 – 4, 2016: Hungarian World Cup in  Győr
 Winner:  OH San-guk
 Team winners: 
 February 3 – 5: Italian Sabre World Cup in  Padua
 Winner:  András Szatmári
 Team winners: 
 February 24 – 26: Polish Sabre World Cup in  Warsaw
 Winner:  Kim Jung-hwan
 Team winners: 
 May 19 – 21: Spanish Sabre World Cup (final) in  Madrid
 Winner:  Max Hartung
 Team winners: 
 Women's Sabre World Cup
 November 18 – 20, 2016: French Sabre World Cup in  Orléans
 Winner:  Manon Brunet
 Team winners: 
 January 27 – 29: American World Cup in  New York City
 Winner:  Cécilia Berder
 Team winners: 
 February 17 – 19: Greek World Cup in  Athens
 Winner:  Anna Márton
 Team winners: 
 March 24 – 26: Chinese Sabre World Cup in  Beijing
 Winner:  Manon Brunet
 Team winners: The 
 May 12 – 14: Tunisian World Cup (final) in  Tunis
 Winner:  Olha Kharlan
 Team winners:

Judo

International judo events
 April 14 – 16: 2017 African Judo Championships in  Antananarivo
  won both the gold and overall medal tallies.
 April 20 – 23: 2017 European Judo Championships in  Warsaw
Russia won the overall medal tally.
 April 28: 2017 Oceania Judo Championships in  Nuku'alofa
  won both the gold and overall medal tallies.
 April 28 – 30: 2017 Pan American Judo Championships in  Panama City
  won both the gold and overall medal tallies.
 May 6 & 7: 2017 Kata European Judo Championships in  Pembroke, Malta
  won both the gold and overall medal tallies.
 May 26 – 28: 2017 Asian Judo Championships in 
  won the gold medal tally.  won the overall medal tally.
 June 15 & 16: 2017 Veteran European Judo Championships in  Zagreb
  won both the gold and overall medal tallies.
 June 30 – July 2: 2017 Cadet European Judo Championships in  Kaunas
  and  won 3 gold medals each. Russia won the overall medal tally.
 August 9 – 13: 2017 World Cadets Judo Championships in  Santiago
  won both the gold and overall medal tallies.
 August 28 – September 3: 2017 World Judo Championships in  Budapest
  won both the gold and overall medal tallies.
 September 3: World Senior Championship Teams 2017 Championships in  Budapest
  won all the gold medals. Japan and  won 6 overall medals each.
 September 15 – 17: 2017 Junior European Judo Championships in  Maribor
Russia won the overall medal tally.
 Team:  (m) /  (f)
 October 18 – 21: 2017 World Junior Judo Championships in  Zagreb
 Note: This event was supposed to be hosted in Pyongyang, but the IJF took it away, due to the ongoing tensions in the region.
  won both the gold and overall medal tallies.
 November 10 – 12: 2017 U23 European Judo Championships in  Podgorica
  won both the gold and overall medal tallies.
 November 11 & 12: 2017 Oceania Open in  Port Vila
  won both the gold and overall medal tallies.
 November 11 & 12: 2017 World Open Judo Championships in  Marrakesh
 Winners:  Teddy Riner (m) /  Sarah Asahina (f)
 November 25: 2017 European Club Championships - Golden League in  Ankara
 Winners:  Team Yewara Neva (m) /  Team Yewara Neva (f)
 November 25 & 26: 2017 European Club Championships - Europa League in  Wuppertal
 Winners:  Team Edelweiss (m) /  Team Flam 91 (f)

Judo Grand Slam
 February 11 & 12: Grand Slam #1 in  Paris
  won both the gold and overall medal tallies.
 March 10 – 12: Grand Slam #2 in  Baku
 The  won the gold medal tally.  won the overall medal tally.
 May 19 – 21: Grand Slam #3 in  Yekaterinburg
  won the gold medal tally.  won the overall medal tally.
 October 27 – 29: Grand Slam #4 in  Abu Dhabi
  won both the gold and overall medal tallies.
 December 1 – 3: Grand Slam #5 (final) in  Tokyo
  won both the gold and overall medal tallies.

Judo Grand Prix
 February 24 – 26: Grand Prix #1 in  Düsseldorf
  won both the gold and overall medal tallies.
 March 31 – April 2: Grand Prix #2 in  Tbilisi
Brazil and Russia won 10 overall medals each.
 April 7 – 9: Grand Prix #3 in  Antalya
  won both the gold and overall medal tallies.
 June 16 – 18: Grand Prix #4 in  Cancún
  won the gold medal tally.  won the overall medal tally.
 June 30 – July 2: Grand Prix #5 in  Hohhot
  won the gold medal tally.  won the overall medal tally.
 September 29 – October 1: Grand Prix #6 in  Zagreb
  won both the gold and overall medal tallies.
 October 6 – 8: Grand Prix #7 in  Tashkent
  won the gold medal tally.  won the overall medal tally.
 November 17 – 19: Grand Prix #8 (final) in  The Hague
 The  won both the gold and overall medal tallies.

Judo Union of Asia (JUA)
 July 8 & 9: Asia Open #1 in  Taipei
  won the gold medal tally.  won the overall medal tally.
 December 9 & 10: Asia Open #2 (final) in 
  won both the gold and overall medal tallies.

European Judo Union (EJU)

 January 9 – November 5: 2017 EJU Open and Cup events

EJU Open
 February 4 & 5: EJU Open #1 in  Sofia (women only)
  won both the gold and overall medal tallies.
 February 4 & 5: EJU Open #2 in  Odivelas (men only)
  and  won 2 gold medals each. France won the overall medal tally.
 February 18 & 19: EJU Open #3 in  Oberwart (women only)
  won both the gold and overall medal tallies.
 February 18 & 19: EJU Open #4 in  Rome (men only)
  won both the gold and overall medal tallies.
 March 4 & 5: EJU Open #5 in  Prague (women only)
 The  and  won 2 gold medals each.  won the overall medal tally.
 March 4 & 5: EJU Open #6 in  Katowice (men only)
  won both the gold and overall medal tallies.
 June 3 & 4: EJU Open #7 in  Bucharest
  won the gold medal tally. France and  won 9 overall medals each.
 July 22 & 23: EJU Open #8 in  Minsk
  won the gold medal tally. Belarus and  won 6 overall medals each.
 September 23 & 24: EJU Open #9 (final) in  Belgrade
  and  won 3 gold medals each.  won the overall medal tally.

EJU Cup
 March 11 & 12: EJU Cup #1 in  Uster
  won both the gold and overall medal tallies.
 April 1 & 2: EJU Cup #2 in  Dubrovnik
  won both the gold and overall medal tallies.
 April 29 & 30: EJU Cup #3 in  Sarajevo
France won the overall medal tally.
 May 13 & 14: EJU Cup #4 in  Orenburg
  won both the gold and overall medal tallies.
 June 17 & 18: EJU Cup #5 in  Celje–Podčetrtek
  won the gold medal tally. Germany, and  won 12 overall medals each.
 July 15 & 16: EJU Cup #6 in  Saarbrücken
 The  won the gold medal tally.  won the overall medal tally..
 September 9 & 10: EJU Cup #7 in  Bratislava
  won the gold medal tally.  won the overall medal tally.
 October 28 & 29: EJU Cup #8 (final) in  Málaga
  won both the gold and overall medal tallies.

African Judo Union (AJU)
 January 14 & 15: AJU Open #1 in  Tunis
  won both the gold and overall medal tallies.
 March 18 & 19: AJU Open #2 in  Casablanca
  won both the gold and overall medal tallies.
 November 18 & 19: AJU Open #3 in  Dakar
  won the gold medal tally.  won the overall medal tally.
 November 25 & 26: AJU Open #4 (final) in  Yaoundé
  won both the gold and overall medal tallies.

Pan American Judo Confederation (CPJ)
 March 11 & 12: CPJ Open #1 in  Buenos Aires
  and the  won 5 gold medals each. Argentina won the overall medal tally. 
 March 18 & 19: CPJ Open #2 in  Santiago
  won both the gold and overall medal tallies.
 March 25 & 26: CPJ Open #3 in  Lima
  won both the gold and overall medal tallies.
 October 7 & 8: CPJ #4 (final) in  Santo Domingo
 The  won both the gold and overall medal tallies.

Karate

International karate events
 June 26 – July 2: 2017 Karate 1–Youth World Cup in  Umag
  won both the gold and overall medal tallies.
 September 16 & 17: 2017 Mediterranean Junior & Cadet and U21 Karate Championships in  Tangier
  won both the gold and overall medal tallies.
 October 26 – 29: 2017 World U21, Junior, and Cadet Karate Championships in  Tenerife
  won both the gold and overall medal tallies.

2017 Karate 1-Series A
 June 17 & 18: K1-SA #1 in  Toledo
  won both the gold and overall medal tallies.
 September 23 & 24: K1-SA #2 in  Istanbul
  won the gold medal tally. Iran and  won 12 overall medals each.
 October 7 & 8: K1-SA #3 in  Salzburg
  and  won 3 gold medals each. Japan won the overall medal tally.
 November 25 & 26: K1-SA #4 (final) in  Okinawa
  won both the gold and overall medal tallies.

2017 Karate 1–Premier League
 January 27 – 29: K1-PL #1 in  Paris
  won both the gold and overall medal tallies.
 March 17 – 19: K1-PL #2 in  Rotterdam
  and  won 4 gold medals each. France won the overall medal tally.
 March 31 – April 2: K1-PL #3 in  Dubai
  won the gold medal tally.  won the overall medal tally. 
 April 14 – 16: K1-PL #4 in  Rabat
  won the gold medal tally.  won the overall medal tally.
 September 8 – 10: K1-PL #5 (final) in  Leipzig
  won both the gold and overall medal tallies.

Asian Karatedo Federation (AKF)
 July 13 – 15: 2017 AKF Cadet, Junior & U-21 Championships in  Astana
  won both the gold and overall medal tallies.
 July 15 – 17: 2017 Asian Karate Championships in  Astana
  won both the gold and overall medal tallies.

European Karate Federation (EKF)
 February 17 – 19: 2017 EKF Junior & Cadet and U21 Karate Championships in  Sofia
  and  won 6 gold medals each.  won the overall medal tally.
 May 4 – 7: 2017 EKF Senior Karate Championships in  Kocaeli
  won both the gold and overall medal tallies.
 June 3 & 4: 2017 EKF Karate Championships For Regions in  Pristina
  won both the gold and overall medal tallies.

Panamerican Karate Federation (PKF)
 May 23 – 27: 2017 PKF Senior Karate Championships in 
  won the gold medal tally. The  won the overall medal tally.
 August 24 – 26: 2017 Pan American Junior, Cadet, & U21 Karate Championships in  Buenos Aires
  won both the gold and overall medal tallies.

African Karate Federation (UFAK)
 May 29 – June 5: 2017 UFAK Senior Karate Championships in  Yaoundé
  won the gold medal tally.  won the overall medal tally.

Oceania Karate Federation (OKF)
 April 7 – 9: 2017 Oceania Karate Championships in  Liverpool, New South Wales (Sydney)
  won both the gold and overall medal tallies.

Kickboxing

Kunlun Fight

International and Continental events
 April 24 – 30: 2017 WAKO Asian Kickboxing Championships in  Ashgabat
  won both the gold and overall medal tallies.
 June 16 – 18: 2017 Bolivarian Kickboxing Championships in  Santo Domingo
  won the gold medal tally.  won the overall medal tally.
 September 2 – 10: 2017 WAKO Cadets and Juniors European Championships in  Skopje
  won both the gold and overall medal tallies.
 September 28 – October 1: 2017 Central American and Caribbean Region Championships in  Port of Spain
 Event postponed.
 November 4 – 12: 2017 WAKO Senior World Championships (All disciplines) in  Budapest
  won both the gold and overall medal tallies.
 November 30 – December 3: 2017 South American Kickboxing Championships in  Foz do Iguaçu
  won both the gold and overall medal tallies.

Open
 February 17 – 19: Kickboxing Finnish Open 2017 in  Järvenpää
  won both the gold and overall medal tallies.
 February 24 – 26: Slovak Open 2017 in  Bratislava
  won both the gold and overall medal tallies.
 March 17 – 19: German Open 2017 in  Munich
  won both the gold and overall medal tallies.
 March 24 – 26: Latvia Open 2017 in  Riga
 April 6 – 9: Turkish Open 2017 in  Antalya
  won both the gold and overall medal tallies.
 April 7 & 8: Yokoso Dutch Open in  Amsterdam
 The  won both the gold and overall medal tallies.
 April 8: Bihac Open in 
 May 5 & 6: Balkan Open in  Tešanj
 May 27: Alpe Adria Open 2017 in  Pula
 October 13 & 14: Czech Open for Tatami Sports in  Prague
 October 13 & 14: Scandinavian Open 2017 in  Oslo
 November 25: Slovenia Open 2017 in  Zagorje ob Savi
 December 8 – 10: Vilnius Open Championship in

WAKO World Cup
 March 3 – 5: 2017 Irish Open International (WAKO World Cup) in  Dublin
  won both the gold and overall medal tallies.
 April 20 – 23: 2017 The Austrian Classics (WAKO World Cup) in  Innsbruck
  won both the gold and overall medals tallies.
 May 18 – 21: Hungary World Cup (WAKO World Cup) in  Budapest
  won both the gold and overall medal tallies.
 June 16 – 18: Bestfighter (WAKO World Cup ) in  Rimini
  won both the gold and overall medalt tallies.
 September 19 – 24: Diamond World Cup (WAKO World Cup) in  Anapa
  won both the gold and overall medal tallies.

WAKO Europe Cup
 January 21 & 22: Golden Glove 2017 in  Treviso
  won both the gold and overall medal tallies.
 February 10 – 12: Karlovac Open 2017 in 
  won both the gold and overall medal tallies.
 September 27 – 30: WAKO K1 European Cup 2017 in  Prague
 The  won both the gold and overall medal tallies.
 November 30 – December 3: 2017 WAKO European Cup in  Nowy Sącz
 Event cancelled.

Mixed martial arts

Ultimate Fighting Championship
 January 13 – 15: UFC Fight Night: Rodríguez vs. Penn in  Phoenix, Arizona
  Yair Rodríguez def. B.J. Penn from TKO (front kick and punches) in round 2.
  Joe Lauzon def.  Marcin Held from Decision (split) (27–30, 29–28, 29–28) in round 3.
  Ben Saunders def.  Court McGee from Decision (unanimous) (29-28, 29-28, 29-28) in round 3.
  Sergio Pettis def.  John Moraga from Decision (unanimous) (29-28, 29-28, 30-27) in round 3.
 January 27 – 29: UFC on Fox: Shevchenko vs. Peña in  Denver
  Valentina Shevchenko def.  Julianna Peña from Submission (armbar) in round 2.
  Jorge Masvidal def.  Donald Cerrone from TKO (punches) in round 2.
  Francis Ngannou def.  Andrei Arlovski from TKO (punches) in round 1.
  Jason Knight def.  Alex Caceres from Submission (rear-naked choke) in round 2.
 February 3 – 5: UFC Fight Night: Bermudez vs. Korean Zombie in  Houston
  Chan Sung Jung def.  Dennis Bermudez from KO (punch) in round 1.
  Felice Herrig def.  Alexa Grasso from Decision (unanimous) (29-28, 29-28, 30-27) in round 3.
  James Vick def.  Abel Trujillo from Submission (D'Arce choke) in round 3.
  Volkan Oezdemir def.  Ovince Saint Preux from  Decision (split) (29-28, 28-29, 29-28) in round 3.
  Marcel Fortuna def.  Anthony Hamilton from KO (punch) in round 1.
  Jéssica Andrade def.  Angela Hill from Decision (unanimous) (30-27, 30-27, 30-27) in round 3.
 February 10 – 12: UFC 208 in  Brooklyn
  Germaine de Randamie defeated  Holly Holm from Decision (unanimous) (48-47, 48-47, 48-47) in round 5.
  Anderson Silva defeated  Derek Brunson from Decision (unanimous) (29-28, 29-28, 30-27) in round 3.
  Ronaldo Souza defeated  Tim Boetsch from Submission (kimura) in round 1.
  Glover Teixeira defeated  Jared Cannonier from Decision (unanimous) (30-26, 30-26, 30-26) in round 3.
  Dustin Poirier defeated  Jim Miller from Decision (majority) (28-28, 30-27, 29-28) in round 3.
 February 17 – 19: UFC Fight Night: Lewis vs. Browne in  Halifax, Nova Scotia
  Derrick Lewis defeated  Travis Browne from KO (punches) in round 2.
  Johny Hendricks defeated  Hector Lombard from Decision (unanimous) (30-27, 30-27, 29-28) in round 3.
  Gavin Tucker defeated  Sam Sicilia from Decision (unanimous) (30-27, 30-27, 30-27) in round 3.
  Elias Theodorou defeated  Cezar Ferreira from Decision (unanimous) (30-27, 29-28, 29-28) in round 3.
  Sara McMann defeated  Gina Mazany from Submission (arm-triangle choke) in round 1.
  Paul Felder defeated  Alessandro Ricci from TKO (elbow and punches) in round 1.
 March 3 – 5: UFC 209 in  Paradise, Nevada
  Tyron Woodley defeated  Stephen Thompson from Decision (majority) (48-47, 47-47, 48-47) in round 5.
  David Teymur defeated  Lando Vannata from Decision (unanimous) (30-27, 30-27, 30-27) in round 3.
  Dan Kelly defeated  Rashad Evans from Decision (split) (29-28, 28-29, 29-28) in round 3.
  Cynthia Calvillo defeated  Amanda Cooper from Submission (rear-naked choke) in round 1.
  Alistair Overeem defeated  Mark Hunt from KO (knees) in round 3.
 March 10 – 12: UFC Fight Night: Belfort vs. Gastelum in  Fortaleza
  Kelvin Gastelum defeated  Vitor Belfort from TKO (punches) in round 1.
  Maurício Rua defeated  Gian Villante from TKO (punches) in round 3.
  Edson Barboza defeated  Beneil Dariush from KO (flying knee) in round 2.
  Ray Borg defeated  Jussier Formiga from Decision (unanimous) (29-28, 29-28, 29-28) in round 3.
  Marion Reneau vs.  Bethe Correia; Result: Draw (majority) (29-27, 28-28, 28-28) in round 3.
  Alex Oliveira defeated  Tim Means from Submission (rear-naked choke) in round 2.
 March 17 – 19: UFC Fight Night: Manuwa vs. Anderson in  London
  Jimi Manuwa defeated  Corey Anderson from KO (punch) in round 1.
  Gunnar Nelson defeated  Alan Jouban from Submission (guillotine choke) in round 2.
  Marlon Vera defeated  Brad Pickett from TKO (head kick and punches) in round 3.
  Arnold Allen defeated  Makwan Amirkhani from Decision (split) (28–29, 30–27, 30–27) in round 3.
 April 7 – 9: UFC 210 in  Buffalo, New York
  Daniel Cormier defeated  Anthony Johnson from Submission (rear-naked choke) in round 2.
  Gegard Mousasi defeated  Chris Weidman from TKO (knees) in round 2.
  Cynthia Calvillo defeated  Pearl Gonzalez from Submission (rear-naked choke) in round 3.
  Thiago Alves defeated  Patrick Côté from Decision (unanimous) (30–27, 30–27, 30–27) in round 3.
  Charles Oliveira defeated  Will Brooks from Submission (rear-naked choke) in round 1.
 April 14 – 16: UFC on Fox: Johnson vs. Reis in  Kansas City, Missouri
  Demetrious Johnson defeated  Wilson Reis from Submission (armbar) in round 3.
  Rose Namajunas defeated  Michelle Waterson from Submission (rear-naked choke) in round 2.
  Robert Whittaker defeated  Ronaldo Souza from TKO (head kick and punches) in round 2.
  Renato Moicano defeated  Jeremy Stephens from Decision (split) (29-28, 28-29, 29-28) in round 3.
 April 21 - 23: UFC Fight Night: Swanson vs. Lobov in  Nashville
  Cub Swanson defeated  Artem Lobov from Decision (unanimous) (49–46, 49–46, 50–45) in round 5.
  Al Iaquinta defeated  Diego Sanchez from KO (punches) in round 1.
  Ovince Saint Preux defeated  Marcos Rogério de Lima from Submission (Von Flue choke) in round 2.
  John Dodson defeated  Eddie Wineland from Decision (unanimous) (29–28, 30–27, 30–27) in round 3.
  Stevie Ray defeated  Joe Lauzon from Decision (majority) (28–27, 29–27, 28–28) in round 3.
  Mike Perry defeated  Jake Ellenberger from KO (elbow) in round 2.
 May 12 - 14: UFC 211 in  Dallas
  Stipe Miocic defeated  Junior dos Santos from TKO (punches) in round 1.
  Joanna Jedrzejczyk defeated  Jéssica Andrade from Decision (unanimous) (50–45, 50–44, 50–45) in round 5.
  Demian Maia defeated  Jorge Masvidal from Decision (split) (29–28, 28–29, 29–28) in round 3.
  Frankie Edgar defeated  Yair Rodríguez from TKO (doctor stoppage) in round 2.
  David Branch defeated  Krzysztof Jotko from Decision (split) (29–28, 28–29, 29–28) in round 3.
 May 26 - 28: UFC Fight Night: Gustafsson vs. Teixeira in  Stockholm
  Alexander Gustafsson defeated  Glover Teixeira from KO (punches) in round 5.
  Volkan Oezdemir defeated  Misha Cirkunov from TKO (punch) in round 1.
  Peter Sobotta defeated  Ben Saunders from TKO (punches and knee) in round 2.
  Omari Akhmedov defeated  Abdul Razak Alhassan from Decision (split) (30–27, 28–29, 30–27) in round 3.
  Nordine Taleb defeated  Oliver Enkamp from Decision (unanimous) (30–27, 30–27, 29–28) in round 3.
   Jack Hermansson defeated  Alex Nicholson from TKO (punches) in round 1.
 June 2 - 4: UFC 212 in  Rio de Janeiro
  Max Holloway defeated  José Aldo from TKO (punches) in round 3.
  Cláudia Gadelha defeated  Karolina Kowalkiewicz from Submission (rear-naked choke) in round 1.
  Vitor Belfort defeated  Nate Marquardt from Decision (unanimous) (29–28, 29–28, 29–28) in round 3.
  Paulo Costa defeated  Oluwale Bamgbose from TKO (punches) in round 2.
  Yancy Medeiros defeated  Erick Silva from TKO (punches) in round 2.
 June 9 - 11: UFC Fight Night: Lewis vs. Hunt in  Auckland
  Mark Hunt defeated  Derrick Lewis from TKO (punches) in round 4.
  Derek Brunson defeated  Dan Kelly from KO (punches) in round 1.
  Dan Hooker defeated  Ross Pearson from KO (knee) in round 2.
  Ion Cutelaba defeated  Henrique da Silva from KO (punches) in round 1.
  Ben Nguyen defeated  Tim Elliott from Submission (rear-naked choke) in round 1.
  Alexander Volkanovski defeated  Mizuto Hirota from Decision (unanimous) (30–27, 30–27, 30–27) in round 3.
 June 16 - 18: UFC Fight Night: Holm vs. Correia in  Kallang
  Holly Holm defeated  Bethe Correia from KO (head kick and punches) in round 3.
  Marcin Tybura defeated  Andrei Arlovski from Decision (unanimous) (29–28, 28–27, 29–27) in round 3.
  Colby Covington defeated  Dong Hyun Kim from Decision (unanimous) (30–25, 30–26, 30–27) in round 3.
  Rafael dos Anjos defeated  Tarec Saffiedine by Decision (unanimous) (30–27, 30–27, 29–28) in round 3.
 June 23 - 25: UFC Fight Night: Chiesa vs. Lee in  Oklahoma City
  Kevin Lee defeated  Michael Chiesa from Technical Submission (rear-naked choke) in round 1.
  Tim Boetsch defeated  Johny Hendricks from TKO (head kick and punches) in round 2.
  Felice Herrig defeated  Justine Kish from Decision (unanimous) (30–26, 30–26, 29–27) in round 3.
  Dominick Reyes defeated  Joachim Christensen from TKO (punches) in round 1.
  Tim Means defeated  Alex Garcia from Decision (unanimous) (29–28, 29–28, 29–28) in round 3.
  Dennis Siver defeated  B.J. Penn from Decision (majority) (28–28, 29–28, 29–27) in round 3.
 July 6 - 8: The Ultimate Fighter: Redemption Finale in  Paradise
  Justin Gaethje defeated  Michael Johnson from TKO (punches and knees) in round 2.
  Jesse Taylor defeated  Dhiego Lima from Submission (rear-naked choke) in round 2.
  Drakkar Klose defeated  Marc Diakiese from Decision (split) (29-28, 28-29, 29-28) in round 3.
  Jared Cannonier defeated  Nick Roehrick from TKO (elbows) in round 3.
  Brad Tavares defeated  Elias Theodorou from Decision (unanimous) (29-28, 29-28, 29-28) in round 3.
  Jordan Johnson defeated  Marcel Fortuna from Decision (unanimous) (29-28, 29-28, 29-28) in round 3.
 July 7 - 9: UFC 213 in  Paradise
  Robert Whittaker defeated  Yoel Romero from Decision (unanimous) (48-47, 48-47, 48-47) in round 5.
  Alistair Overeem defeated  Fabrício Werdum from Decision (majority) (28-28, 29-28, 29-28) in round 3.
  Curtis Blaydes defeated  Daniel Omielanczuk from Decision (unanimous) (30-27, 30-27, 30-27)
  Anthony Pettis defeated  Jim Miller from Decision (unanimous) (30-27, 30-27, 30-27) in round 3.
  Rob Font defeated  Douglas Silva de Andrade from Submission (guillotine choke) in round 2.
 July 14 - 16: UFC Fight Night: Nelson vs. Ponzinibbio in  Glasgow
  Santiago Ponzinibbio defeated  Gunnar Nelson from KO (punches) in round 1.
  Cynthia Calvillo defeated  Joanne Calderwood from Decision (unanimous) (30-27, 30-27, 29-28) in round 3.
  Paul Felder defeated  Stevie Ray from KO (elbows) in round 1.
  Jack Marshman defeated  Ryan Janes from Decision (unanimous) (29-28, 29-28, 29-28) in round 3.
  Khalil Rountree Jr. defeated  Paul Craig from KO (punches) in round 1.
  Justin Willis defeated  James Mulheron from Decision (unanimous) (30-27, 30-27, 30-27) in round 3.
 July 21 - 23: UFC on Fox: Weidman vs. Gastelum in  Uniondale, New York
  Chris Weidman defeated  Kelvin Gastelum from Submission (arm-triangle choke) in round 3.
  Darren Elkins defeated  Dennis Bermudez from Decision (split) (29-28, 28-29, 29-28) in round 3.
  Patrick Cummins defeated  Gian Villante from Decision (split) (29-28, 28-29, 29-28) in round 3.
  Jimmie Rivera defeated  Thomas Almeida from Decision (unanimous) (29-28, 30-26, 30-27) in round 3.
 July 28 - 30: UFC 214 in  Anaheim
  Daniel Cormier vs.  Jon Jones Result: No Contest (overturned by CSAC) in round 3.
  Tyron Woodley defeated  Demian Maia from Decision (unanimous) (50-45, 49-46, 49-46) in round 5.
  Cris Cyborg defeated  Tonya Evinger from TKO (knees) in round 3.
  Robbie Lawler defeated  Donald Cerrone from Decision (unanimous) (29-28, 29-28, 29-28) in round 3.
  Volkan Oezdemir defeated  Jimi Manuwa from KO (punches) in round 1.
 August 4 - 6: UFC Fight Night: Pettis vs. Moreno in  Mexico City
  Sergio Pettis defeated  Brandon Moreno from Decision (unanimous) (49-46, 48-46, 48-46) in round 5.
  Alexa Grasso defeated  Randa Markos from Decision (split) (29-28, 28-29, 29-28) in round 3.
  Niko Price defeated  Alan Jouban from TKO (punches) in round 1.
  Humberto Bandenay defeated  Martin Bravo from KO (knee) in round 1.
  Sam Alvey defeated  Rashad Evans from Decision (split) (28-29, 29-28, 29-28) in round 3.
  Alejandro Pérez defeated  Andre Soukhamthath from Decision (split) (29-28, 28-29, 29-28) in round 3.
 September 1 - 3: UFC Fight Night: Volkov vs. Struve in  Rotterdam
  Alexander Volkov defeated  Stefan Struve from TKO (punches) in round 3.
  Siyar Bahadurzada defeated  Rob Wilkinson from TKO (punches) in round 2.
  Marion Reneau defeated  Talita Bernardo from TKO (punches) in round 3.
  Leon Edwards defeated  Bryan Barberena from Decision (unanimous) (29-28, 29-28, 29-28) in round 3.
 September 8 - 10: UFC 215 in  Edmonton
  Amanda Nunes defeated  Valentina Shevchenko from Decision (split) (47-48, 48-47, 48-47) in round 5.
  Rafael dos Anjos defeated  Neil Magny from Submission (arm-triangle choke) in round 1.
  Henry Cejudo defeated  Wilson Reis from TKO (punches) in round 2.
  Ilir Latifi defeated  Tyson Pedro from Decision (unanimous) (29-28, 29-28, 30-27) in round 3.
  Jeremy Stephens defeated  Gilbert Melendez from Decision (unanimous) (30-26, 30-26, 30-25) in round 3.
 September 15 - 17: UFC Fight Night: Rockhold vs. Branch in  Pittsburgh
  Luke Rockhold defeated  David Branch from Submission (punches) in round 2.
  Mike Perry defeated  Alex Reyes from KO (knee) in round 1.
  Anthony Smith defeated  Hector Lombard from TKO (punches) in round 3.
  Gregor Gillespie defeated  Jason Gonzalez from Submission (arm-triangle choke) in round 2.
  Kamaru Usman defeated  Sérgio Moraes from KO (punch) in round 1.
  Justin Ledet defeated  Zu Anyanwu from Decision (split) (28-29, 29-28, 29-28) in round 3.
 September 22 - 24: UFC Fight Night: Saint Preux vs. Okami in  Saitama
  Ovince Saint Preux defeated  Yushin Okami from Technical Submission (Von Flue choke) in round 1.
  Jéssica Andrade defeated  Cláudia Gadelha from Decision (unanimous) (30-25, 30-26, 30-27) in round 3.
  Dong Hyun Ma defeated  Takanori Gomi from TKO (punches) in round 1.
  Gökhan Saki defeated  Henrique da Silva from KO (punch) in round 1.
  Teruto Ishihara defeated  Rolando Dy from Decision (unanimous) (28-27, 28-27, 29-27) in round 3.
  Jussier Formiga defeated  Ulka Sasaki from Submission (rear-naked choke) in round 1.

Taekwondo

International taekwondo events
 February 6 – 9: 2017 WTF European Clubs Taekwondo Championships in  Belek
  won both the gold and overall medal tallies.
 April 6 – 9: 2017 European U21 Taekwondo Championships in  Sofia
  won both the gold and overall medal tallies.
 April 7 – 9: 2017 WTF President's Cup (African Region) in  Agadir
  won the gold medal tally.  won the overall medal tally.
 April 13 & 14: 2017 WTF Asian Clubs Taekwondo Championships in  Sari, Iran
 Champions:  Shahrdari Varamin; Second:  Shohadaye Modafe Haram; Third:  Moghavemat
 April 19 – 21: 2017 Asian Junior Taekwondo Championships in  Atyrau
  won the gold medal tally.  won the overall medal tally.
 April 24 – 30: ITF European Taekwon-Do Championships 2017 in  Liverpool
 For results, click here.
 April 27 – 30: 2017 WTF President's Cup (European Region) in  Athens
  and  won 4 gold medals each.  and Russia won 11 overall medals each.
 May 5 & 6: 2017 WTF Taekwondo Beach World Championships  Rhodes (debut event)
  won the gold medal tally.  won the overall medal tally.
 June 6 – 8: 2017 Asian Taekwondo Cadet Championships in  Ho Chi Minh City
  won both the gold and overall medal tallies.
 June 22 – 30: 2017 World Taekwondo Championships in  Muju
  won both the gold and overall medal tallies.
 August 4 – 6: 2017 World Taekwondo Grand-Prix Series 1 in  Moscow
  won both the gold and overall medal tallies.
 August 11 – 13: 2017 WTF President's Cup (Asian Region) in  Tashkent
  won both the gold and overall medal tallies.
 August 24 – 27: 2017 World Cadet Taekwondo Championships in  Sharm El Sheikh
Thailand and Iran won 9 overall medals each.
 August 29 – 31: 2017 Pan American Cadet and Junior Taekwondo Championships in  San José, Costa Rica
 Junior:  and the  won 6 gold medals each. Mexico won the overall medal tally.
 Cadet: The  won both the gold and overall medal tallies.
 September 22 – 24: 2017 World Taekwondo Grand-Prix Series 2 in  Rabat
  won both the gold and overall medal tallies.
 September 27 & 28: 2017 Commonwealth Taekwondo Championships in  Montreal
  won both the gold and overall medal tallies.
 October 5 – 8: 2017 WTF President's Cup (Pan American Region) in  Las Vegas
  won the gold medal tally. The  won the overall medal tally.
 October 5 – 8: 2017 European Cadet Taekwondo Championships in  Budapest
  won both the gold and overall medal tallies.
 October 20 – 22: 2017 World Taekwondo Grand-Prix Series 3 in  London
  won the gold medal tally. Great Britain and  won 5 overall medals each.
 November 2 – 4: 2017 European Junior Taekwondo Championships in  Larnaca
  won both the gold and overall medal tallies.
 December 2 & 3: 2017 World Taekwondo Grand Prix Final in  Abidjan
  and  won 2 gold medals each. South Korea won the overall medal tally.
 December 5 & 6: 2017 World Cup Taekwondo Team Championships in  Abidjan
 Men's Champions: ; Second: ; Third:  & 
 Women's Champions: ; Second: ; Third:  & 
 Mixed Team Champions: ; Second: ; Third:  & a joint team from  & the

WTF's Open events
 January 21 & 22: 2017 German Open in  Hamburg
  won the gold medal tally.  won the overall medal tally.
 January 31 – February 3: 2017 US Open in  Las Vegas
  won the gold medal tally. The  won the overall medal tally.
 February 11 – 14: 2017 Turkish Open in  Belek
  won both the gold and overall medal tallies.
 February 17 – 19: 2017 Egyptian Open in  Luxor
  won both the gold and overall medal tallies.
 February 23 – 25: 2017 Fujairah Open in the 
  won all the gold medals and the overall medal tally, too.
 March 4 & 5: 2017 Sofia Open in 
  won both the gold and overall medal tallies.
 March 11 & 12: 2017 Dutch Open in  Eindhoven
  and  won 5 gold medals each. Turkey won the overall medal tally. 
 March 14 – 17: 2017 Colombia Open  Bogotá
  won both the gold and overall medal tallies.
 March 17 – 19: 2017 Belgian Open in  Lommel
 March 26: 2017 Spanish Open in  Alicante
  won both the gold and overall medal tallies. 
 April 16 & 17: 2017 Fajr Open in  Sari
  won both the gold and overall medal tallies.
 April 22 – 24: 2017 Kazakh Open in  Atyrau
  and  won 6 gold medals each. Kazakhstan won the overall medal tally.
 May 13 & 14: 2017 New Zealand Open in  Auckland
  won the gold medal tally.  won the overall medal tally.
 May 20 & 21: 2017 Moldova Open in  Chișinău
Serbia and  won 5 overall medals each.
 June 3 & 4: 2017 Austrian Open in  Innsbruck
  won both the gold and overall medal tallies.
 June 10 & 11: 2017 Lux Open in  Luxembourg City
  won both the gold and overall medal tallies.
 July 2 – 7: 2017 Korean Open in  Chuncheon
  won both the gold and overall medal tallies.
 August 8 & 9: 2017 Russian Open in  Moscow
  won both the gold and overall medal tallies.
 August 18 – 20: 2017 Argentina Open in  Buenos Aires
  won both the gold and overall medal tallies.
 September 1 – 3: 2017 Costa Rica Open in  San José, Costa Rica
 The  won both the gold and overall medal tallies.
 September 16 & 17: 2017 Polish Open in  Warsaw
  won the gold medal tally.  won the overall medal tally.
 September 28 – 30: 2017 Palestinian Open in  Ramallah
  won both the gold and overall medal tallies.
 October 14 & 15: 2017 Serbia Open in  Belgrade
  won both the gold and overall medal tallies.
 November 17 – 19: 2017 Greek Open in  Athens
  won both the gold and overall medal tallies.
 November 18 & 19: 2017 French Open in  Paris
  won the gold medal tally.  won the overall medal tally.
 November 25 & 26: 2017 Israeli Open in  Ramla
  won the gold medal tally.  won the overall medal tally.

Wrestling

International wrestling championships
 August 1 – 6: 2017 World Junior Wrestling Championships in  Tampere
 Junior Men's Freestyle:  won the gold medal tally. The  won the overall medal tally.
 Junior Women's Freestyle:  won both the gold and overall medal tallies.
 Junior Greco-Roman:  won the gold medal tally. Iran and  won 5 overall medals each.
 August 21 – 27: 2017 World Wrestling Championships in  Paris
 Men's Freestyle: The  and  won 2 gold medals each. The United States won the overall medal tally.
 Women's Freestyle:  won both the gold and overall medal tallies.
 Greco-Roman:  and  won 2 gold medals each.  won the overall medal tally.
 September 5 – 10: 2017 World Cadet Wrestling Championships in  Athens
 Cadet Men's Freestyle: The  won the gold medal tally.  won the overall medal tally.
 Cadet Women's Freestyle:  won both the gold and overall medal tallies.
 Cadet Greco-Roman:  won the gold medal tally.  won the overall medal tally.
 September 20 – 23: 2017 World Military Wrestling Championships in  Klaipėda
 Men's Freestyle:  won both the gold and overall medal tallies.
 Women's Freestyle:  and  won 2 gold medals each. China won the overall medal tally.
 Greco-Roman:  and  won 2 gold medals each. Russia won the overall medal tally.
 October 10 – 15: 2017 World Veteran Wrestling Championships in  Plovdiv
 For results, click here and click on the Results & Videos tab.
 October 13 – 15: 2017 World Beach Wrestling Championships in  Dalyan
 For results, click here and click on the Results & Videos tab.
 November 21 – 26: 2017 World U-23 Wrestling Championships in  Bydgoszcz
 Men's U23 Freestyle:  won both the gold and overall medal tallies.
 Women's U23 Freestyle:  won both the gold and overall medal tallies.
 U23 Greco-Roman:  and  won 2 gold medals each. Russia, Turkey, and  won 4 overall medals each.
 December 14 – 17: 2017 Commonwealth Wrestling Championships in  Johannesburg
 Men's Freestyle:  won all the gold medals, in addition to winning the overall medal tally, too.
 Women's Freestyle:  won both the gold and overall medal tallies.
 Greco-Roman:  won all the gold and silver medals, in addition to winning the overall medal tally, too.

World Cup of wrestling
 February 16 & 17: 2017 Wrestling World Cup - Men's freestyle in  Tehran
 Champions: ; Second: ; Third: 
 March 16 & 17: 2017 Wrestling World Cup - Men's Greco-Roman in  Tehran
 Champions: ; Second: ; Third: 
 December 1 & 2: 2017 Wrestling World Cup - Women's freestyle in  Cheboksary
 Champions: ; Second: ; Third: 
 December 7 & 8: 2017 World Wrestling Clubs Cup (Men's Freestyle) in  Tehran
 Champions:  Easy Pipe Kashan; Second:  Titan Mercury; Third:  Setaregan Sari
 December 14 & 15: 2017 World Wrestling Clubs Cup (Greco-Roman) in  Tehran
 Champions:  Bimeh Razi Isfahan; Second:  Sina Sanat Izeh; Third:  Buyuksehir

Wrestling Grand Prix
 March 10 – 12: 2017 Grand Prix Zagreb Open in 
 Greco-Roman:  and  won 2 gold medals each. Croatia and the  won 5 overall medals each.
 June 3 & 4: 2017 Grand Prix of Germany in  Dormagen
 Women's Freestyle:  won the gold medal tally.  won the overall medal tally.
 June 10 – 12: 2017 Grand Prix of Tbilisi in 
 Men's Freestyle:  won both the gold and overall medal tallies.
 Greco-Roman:  won both the gold and overall medal tallies.
 July 15 & 16: 2017 Grand Prix of Spain in  Madrid
 Men's Freestyle: The  won both the gold and overall medal tallies.
 Women's Freestyle: The  and  won 2 gold medals each. The United States won the overall medal tally.
 Greco-Roman:  won both the gold and overall medal tallies.

Continental wrestling championships
 March 9 – 12: 2017 Oceania (Senior, Junior, & Cadet) Wrestling Championships in  Pirae
 Note: There was no Cadet Women's Freestyle event here.
 Men's Freestyle:  won both the gold and overall medal tallies.
 Women's Freestyle:  won both the gold and overall medal tallies.
 Greco-Roman winners:  Thomas Wichilbuch (71 kg) /  Skarlee Renguul (75 kg) /  Tevaihi Trafton (85 kg) /  Jean Tautu (130 kg)
 Junior Men's Freestyle winners:  Samuel Harrison (55 kg) /  Suraj Singh (60 kg) /  Paul Aguon III (66 kg) /  Iafeta Peni Vou (74 kg)
 Junior Women's Freestyle winners:  Mystique Townsend (48 kg) /  Aliena Coleman (72 kg)
 Junior Greco-Roman winners:  Randy Ngeyus (60 kg) /  Nicholas Low (66 kg) /  Iafeta Peni Vou (74 kg)
 Cadet Men's Freestyle winners:  Ryan Marshall (69 kg) /  Terangi Vinckier (76 kg)
 Cadet Greco-Roman:  Samuel Harrison (58 kg) /  Benjamin Tustin (63 kg) /  Kylian Asin Moux (76 kg)
 March 28 – April 2: 2017 European U23 Wrestling Championship in  Szombathely
 Men's Freestyle:  won the gold medal tally.  won the overall medal tally.
 Women's Freestyle:  and  won 2 gold and 5 overall medals each.
 Greco-Roman:  won the gold medal tally.  won the overall medal tally.
 April 26 – 30: 2017 African (Senior, Junior, & Cadet) Wrestling Championships in  Marrakesh
 Men's Freestyle:  and  won 3 gold medals each. Egypt and  won 5 overall medals each. 
Nigeria and Tunisia won 6 overall medals each.
 Greco-Roman:  won the gold medal tally.  won the overall medal tally.
 Junior Men's Freestyle:  and  won 3 gold and 5 overall medals each.
 Junior Women's Freestyle:  won both the gold and overall medal tallies.
 Junior Greco-Roman:  and  won 3 gold medals each. Tunisia won the overall medal tally.
 Cadet Men's Freestyle:  and  won 3 gold medals each. South Africa won the overall medal tally.
 Cadet Women's Freestyle:  won both the gold and overall medal tallies.
 Cadet Greco-Roman:  and  won 3 gold medals each. Tunisia won the overall medal tally.
 May 2 – 7: 2017 European Wrestling Championships in  Novi Sad
 Men's Freestyle:  won the gold medal tally.  won the overall medal tally.
 Women's Freestyle:  won the gold medal tally. Russia, and  won 3 overall medals each.
 Greco-Roman:  won the gold medal tally.  won the overall medal tally.
 May 5 – 7: 2017 Pan American Wrestling Championships in  Salvador, Bahia
 Men's Freestyle: The  won the gold medal tally. The United States and  won 7 overall medals each.
 Women's Freestyle:  won both the gold and overall medal tallies.
 Greco-Roman:  won the gold medal tally. Cuba and the  won 5 overall medals each.
 May 10 – 14: 2017 Asian Wrestling Championships in  New Delhi
 Men's Freestyle:  won both the gold and overall medal tallies.
 Women's Freestyle:  won both the gold and overall medal tallies.
 Grecoo-Roman:  won both the gold and overall medal tallies.
 May 27 & 28: 2017 Nordic Junior and Cadet Wrestling Championships in  Kolding
 Note: There were no junior men's and women's freestyle events here.
 Junior Greco-Roman:  won the gold medal tally.  and  won 5 overall medals each.
 Cadet Men's Freestyle:  won both the gold and overall medal tallies.
 Cadet Women's Freestyle:  won both the gold and overall medal tallies.
 Cadet Greco-Roman:  and  won 3 gold medals each. Finland won the overall medal tally.
 June 9 – 11: 2017 Pan American Junior Wrestling Championships in  Lima
 Junior Men's Freestyle: The  won both the gold and overall medal tallies.
Canada won the overall medal tally.
 Junior Greco-Roman: The  won both the gold and overall medal tallies.
 June 10: 2017 Nordic Wrestling Championships in  Panevėžys
 Men's Freestyle:  won both the gold and overall medal tallies.
 Women's Freestyle:  won both the gold and overall medal tallies.
 Greco-Roman:  won the gold medal tally.  won the overall medal tally.
 June 15 – 18: 2017 Asian Junior Wrestling Championships in  Taichung
 Junior Men's Freestyle:  won both the gold and overall medal tallies.
 Junior Women's Freestyle:  won both the gold and overall medal tallies.
 Junior Greco-Roman:  won both the gold and overall medal tallies.
 June 16 – 18: 2017 South American Junior Wrestling Championships in  Lima
 Junior Men's Freestyle:  won both the gold and overall medal tallies.
 Junior Women's Freestyle:  won the gold medal tally.  won the overall medal tally.
 Junior Greco-Roman:  won both the gold and overall medal tallies.
 June 27 – July 2: 2017 European Junior Wrestling Championships in  Dortmund
 Junior Men's Freestyle:  won the gold medal tally. Russia and  won 6 overall medals each.
 Junior Women's Freestyle:  won both the gold and overall medal tallies.
 Junior Greco-Roman:  won both the gold and overall medal tallies.
 July 7 – 9: 2017 Pan American Cadet Wrestling Championships in  Buenos Aires
 Cadet Men's Freestyle: The  won both the gold and overall medal tallies.
 Cadet Women's Freestyle: The  won both the gold and overall medal tallies.
 Cadet Greco-Roman:  won the gold medal tally. The  won the overall medal tally.
 July 13 – 15: 2017 South American Cadet Wrestling Championships in  Buenos Aires
 Cadet Men's Freestyle:  and  won 3 gold medals each. Argentina won the overall medal tally.
 Cadet Women's Freestyle:  won the gold medal tally.  won the overall medal tally.
 Cadet Greco-Roman:  won both the gold and overall medal tallies.
 July 20 – 23: 2017 Asian Cadet Wrestling Championships in  Bangkok
 Cadet Men's Freestyle:  won both the gold and overall medal tallies.
 Cadet Women's Freestyle:  won both the gold and overall medal tallies.
 Cadet Greco-Roman:  won the gold medal tally.  won the overall medal tally.
 July 25 – 30: 2017 European Cadet Wrestling Championships in  Sarajevo
 Cadet Men's Freestyle:  won both the gold and overall medal tallies.
 Cadet Women's Freestyle:  won both the gold and overall medal tallies.
 Cadet Greco-Roman:  and  won 3 gold medals each. Russia and  won 5 overall medals each.
 October 27 – 29: 2017 Balkan Junior Wrestling Championships in  Bursa
 Junior Men's Freestyle:  won both the gold and overall medal tallies.
 Junior Women's Freestyle:  won the gold medal tally. Romania and  won 8 overall medals each.
 Junior Greco-Roman:  won both the gold and overall medal tallies.
 November 22 & 23: 2017 South American Wrestling Championships in  Rio de Janeiro
 Men's Freestyle:  and  won 3 gold medals each.  won the overall medal tally.
 Women's Freestyle:  won both the gold and overall medal tallies.
 Greco-Roman:  won both the gold and overall medal tallies.

References

External links
 International Boxing Association (Amateur)
 FIE - Fédération Internationale d'Escrime (International Fencing Federation)
 International Judo Federation
 World Karate Federation
 World Association of Kickboxing Organizations
 World Taekwondo Federation
 United World Wrestling

Combat sports
combat